The Socotra buzzard (Buteo socotraensis) is a medium to large bird of prey that is sometimes considered a subspecies of the widespread common buzzard (Buteo buteo). As its name implies, it is native to the island of Socotra, Yemen. Although it is listed as vulnerable in the IUCN Red List, its population is considered to be stable.

Description
The Socotra buzzard measures 45 cm in length. Adults typically have yellow-white abdomen and breast. They display fine brown streaking on their throat and breast, with the streaking being heavier on breast, abdomen, flanks, and thighs. Certain individuals display a white throat and upper breast. The species exhibits short, compact wings with a length of approximately 358 mm, a tail length of 188.5 mm, and a tarsus length of 65.19 mm. There is little difference in plumage between adults and juveniles, the main difference being in the intensity of the streaking on the underparts

Taxonomy
Although the species has been observed for more than 110 years,  it wasn't recognized as an official species until 2010. Prior to that, it was assumed to be the same species as B. buteo. There has been much debate about the taxonomic position of the Socotra buzzard. It is genetically closest to the taxa rufinus and bannermani, but its plumage is most similar to the taxa trizonatus/oreophilus.

Habitat and Distribution
Buteo socotraensis is found only on the island of Socotra, Yemen. The species lives in foothills and plateaux of the island, as well as places where one can find deep ravines. It is usually found at altitudes between 150–800 m. The species requires cliffs to nest, as it does not seem to be dependent on trees. As such, it has been observed that it might compete for nesting grounds with other bird species such as vultures, ravens, and falcons. According to the most recent population surveys, it has been suggested that there are fewer than 500 individuals on the island.

Behaviour

Vocalizations
Only one sonogram has been made of B. socotraensis, and because of such a small sample size, this behavioural trait has not been included in its taxonomy. Its call is very similar to other species of the same genus, namely Buteo rufinus, B. buteo, and B. oreophilus . A key identifying characteristic of the species' call is the short period (<1 second) between calls. Its call has a frequency of 2.2 kHz, a similar but different frequency than other species in the same taxa.

Diet
The island of Socotra island has very scarce population of mammals, making the Socotra buzzard's diet consist of mainly reptiles and invertebrates. Its opportunistic hunting style makes it unlikely that it hunts on other species of birds.

Reproduction
Aerial tumbling and talon grappling have been observed as behaviour during breeding season, which usually occurs in September–April, with egg laying in September–January. They build their nests on cliffs or crevices, and their broods have been observed to range between 1-3 nestlings. Both male and females have been observed tending to their young, and remaining present during the post-fledging period. Nests have been found at altitudes of 150-650m, in shaded areas to protect them from the sun during the day.

References

External links

 Clements, J. F., T. S. Schulenberg, M. J. Iliff, B.L. Sullivan, C. L. Wood, and D. Roberson. 2011. The Clements checklist of birds of the world: Version 6.6. Downloaded from http://www.birds.cornell.edu/clementschecklist/downloadable-clements-checklist

Birds described in 2010
Birds of prey
Buteo
Endemic birds of Socotra